The Hildegard of Bingen Gymnasium (Hildegard-von-Bingen-Gymnasium) is a co-ed high school in the district of Sülz, Cologne. It is named after the Benedictine Hildegard of Bingen.

External links
Website (In German) of HvB-Gymnasium

Gymnasiums in Germany
Schools in Cologne
1888 establishments in Germany
Educational institutions established in 1888
Hildegard of Bingen